Cider Run may refer to:

Cider Run (Bowman Creek), Wyoming County, Pennsylvania
Cider Run (Sutton Creek), Luzerne County, Pennsylvania